Fukutin is a eukaryotic protein necessary for the maintenance of muscle integrity, cortical histogenesis, and normal ocular development. Mutations in the fukutin gene have been shown to result in Fukuyama congenital muscular dystrophy (FCMD) characterised by brain malformation - one of the most common autosomal-recessive disorders in Japan. In humans this protein is encoded by the FCMD gene (also named FKTN), located on chromosome 9q31. Human fukutin exhibits a length of 461 amino acids and a predicted molecular mass of 53.7 kDa.

Function 

Although its function is mostly unknown, fukutin is a putative transmembrane protein that is ubiquitously expressed, although at higher levels in skeletal muscle, heart and brain. It is localized to the cis-Golgi compartment, where it may be involved in the glycosylation of α-dystroglycan in skeletal muscle. The encoded protein is thought to be a glycosyltransferase and could play a role in brain development. Fukutin is expressed in the mammalian retina and is located in the Golgi complex of retinal neurons.

Clinical significance 

Defects in this gene are a cause of Fukuyama congenital muscular dystrophy (FCMD), Walker-Warburg syndrome (WWS), limb-girdle muscular dystrophy type 2M (LGMD2M), and dilated cardiomyopathy type 1X (CMD1X).

See also
 Fukutin-related protein

References

Further reading

External links
  GeneReviews/NCBI/NIH/UW entry on Congenital Muscular Dystrophy Overview
 LOVD mutation database: FKTN